Negele is the name of two towns in the Oromia Region of Ethiopia:

 Negele Arsi (or Arsi Negele), in Mirab Arsi Zone
 Negele Boran, in Guji Zone

People
 Negele Knight (born 1967), American basketball player